Randolph Southern Junior-Senior High School is a public high school located in Lynn, Indiana.

The current school building was built in 1974.

Athletics
Randolph Southern Junior-Senior High school's athletic teams are known as the Rebels and compete in the Mid-Eastern Conference. The school offers a wide range of athletics including:
Baseball
Basketball (Men's and Women's)
Cheerleading
Cross country
Golf (Men's only)
Softball
Tennis (Men's and Women's)
Track & Field (Men's and Women's)
Volleyball
Wrestling

See also
 List of high schools in Indiana

References

External links
 Official website

Buildings and structures in Randolph County, Indiana
Schools in Randolph County, Indiana
Public middle schools in Indiana
Public high schools in Indiana
1974 establishments in Indiana